Yoga mats are specially fabricated mats used to prevent hands and feet slipping during asana practice in modern yoga as exercise. An early variety made of rubber carpet underlay, pioneered by the yoga teacher Angela Farmer in 1982, was called a sticky mat. 

Before modern times, meditative yoga and hatha yoga were practised on bare ground, sometimes with a deer or tiger skin rug. Modern mats suitable for energetic forms of yoga are made of plastic, rubber, and sometimes other materials including hessian and cork, trading off cost, comfort, grip, and weight.

The yoga mat has been called "One of the most ubiquitous symbols of yoga's commercialization".

History

In ancient India 

In ancient times, meditational yoga was practised in India on kusha grass, on hard earth without any cover, or on a rug of deer or tiger skin, as specified in the Bhagavadgita and the Shvetashvatara Upanishad as suitable for attaining enlightenment.

Due to the scarcity and cost of such rugs, they are now rarely used even in India.

Origin of the modern yoga mat 

With yoga's introduction in the West, many practitioners used towels or cotton mats on wooden floors. Feet tended to skid on these surfaces, requiring strength just to stand still in a pose like Trikonasana.
In 1982, while teaching yoga in Germany, Angela Farmer used carpet underlay cut to towel size during yoga classes; she returned home to London with the material. Angela's father, Richard Farmer, contacted the German padding manufacturer and became the first retailer of "sticky mats". The first, purpose-made yoga mat was manufactured and sold by Hugger Mugger Yoga Products in the 1990s; the company initially imported Farmer-style mats, but finding that they began to crumble with use, developed their own more robust alternative.

Types

Yoga mats vary in thickness, composition, surface texture, "stickiness" or grip, and weight, as well as price. Mats are available in many colours and patterns. "Alignment mats" are printed with guides to proper alignment, intended to help practitioners to place their feet the right distance apart and accurately in line with each other. Others are printed with images. Some travel mats can be folded into a small square.

The first commercially produced "sticky" yoga mats were made from PVC; they have a smooth surface, and tend to be cheaper. More recently, some supposedly "eco-friendly" mats are being made from natural jute, organic cotton, and rubber. PVC mats are the spongiest, resulting in more "give" when stepped on; fibre mats such as cotton and jute are the firmest. Jute mats are the roughest; "sticky" PVC mats give good grip, but some of the modern textured mats in other materials also grip well. Smooth mats provide the most grip, so are suitable for the more energetic styles such as hot yoga and Ashtanga vinyasa yoga; the trade-off is that they may be less comfortable and appear dirty more quickly. Mats with more padding are useful for styles such as yin yoga where poses are held for longer periods. Travel mats are thinner and lighter, but provide less padding.

Some yoga practices in Scandinavia use cotton futon mats. They consist of a mattress, usually with pockets of cotton batting, sometimes with wool or polyester-cotton mixes, and a washable cover. They give good cushioning and grip. However, futons are much heavier than other mats, weighing as much as 4.7 kg.
 
Yoga Journal asked five yoga professionals for their views on yoga mats. They varied widely in their brand preferences, some choosing the traditional "sticky" type, but they agreed that mats must not be slippery.

A hessian mat reviewed by The Independent gave good grip and was both comfortable and attractive; its rubber underside made it stable on any surface, but somewhat heavy; a cork mat provided both good grip and an exceptionally warm surface with a pleasant texture, and the property of being to some degree self-cleaning. The best grip was given by a smooth latex mat; in the review's opinion, its 4 mm thickness both gave enough padding for yin yoga, and the stability for energetic yoga styles. The review noted that a circular mat was at first unfamiliar, but helpful for personal practice of poses such as Prasārita Pādottānāsana (wide stance forward bend) and sequences where a rectangular mat would have to be turned through 90 degrees at intervals; it was also ideal for demonstrating asanas to a class.

 * Comfort and weight depend on thickness; people choose thinner mats for portability, or thicker ones for comfort.
 # Environmental impact of these products depends on how they are grown; impact will be low if they are grown with low usage of pesticides, or in the case of rubber, if from suitably certified forests.

In popular culture

The yoga mat has become the definitive symbol of modern yoga as exercise.
The journalist Ann Louise Bardach wrote in The New York Times in 2011 that "precious few of the estimated 16 million supple, spandex-clad yoginis in the United States, who sustain an annual $6 billion industry, seem to have a clue that they owe their yoga mats to Vivekananda." The yoga scholar Andrea Jain wrote in The Washington Post that "One of the most ubiquitous symbols of yoga's commercialization is the mat, which many consider a necessity to prevent slipping, to mark territory in crowded classes or to create a ritual space." She noted that "committed adherents" could pay over $100 for a luxury mat. The yoga scholar Noora-Helena Korpelainen agreed that the yoga mat had a ritual function: every Ashtanga Yoga session "starts with opening a yoga mat, taking a straight standing pose (samastitiḥ) and chanting a mantra. ... The practice ends with a mantra, relaxation, and rolling up the mat."

See also

 Yoga in advertising
 Yoga brick
 Yoga pants
 Yoga using props

References

External links

Exercise equipment
Mat
Yoga as exercise